Zara Northover (born March 6, 1984) is a Jamaican shot putter. Northover has dual citizenship in the United States and Jamaica, and competed for Jamaica at the 2008 Summer Olympics.

Northover attended Northeastern University in Boston, Massachusetts, where she competed on the women's track and field team, and graduated in 2007 with a bachelor's degree in communications and a minor in political science. As a senior, Northover was named Colonial Athletic Association Field Athlete of the Year after winning the shot put, discus and hammer and placing seventh in the javelin, helping lead Northeastern to their first CAA title in any sport. Her throw at the Eastern College Athletic Conference Championship during the 2007 outdoor season set both Northeastern and ECAC records. Northover was a five-time NCAA Championship qualifier and had the best national finish of her career in her final season, placing 10th at the NCAA Championship during the 2007 outdoor season, and was nominated for the NCAA Woman of the Year Award.

Internationally, she finished fifth at the 2006 Central American and Caribbean Games. On June 8, 2008, Northover won the Island Games in Uniondale, New York, with a throw of 17.56 meters, allowing her to compete in the Jamaican Olympic Trials in Kingston, Jamaica. She won the shot put at the Olympic Trials on June 28, 2008, with a throw of 16.78 meters. She was officially selected to represent Jamaica in Beijing by the Jamaica Amateur Athletic Association on July 8, 2008, becoming the first Northeastern women’s athlete to compete in a Summer Olympics.

References

External links
Official website

Zara Northover at Northeastern University Track & Field
Zara Northover at JamaicaAthletics.org
Zara Northover at DirectAthletics, Inc.

1984 births
Living people
Jamaican female shot putters
Athletes (track and field) at the 2008 Summer Olympics
Athletes (track and field) at the 2010 Commonwealth Games
Athletes (track and field) at the 2011 Pan American Games
Olympic athletes of Jamaica
Commonwealth Games competitors for Jamaica
Pan American Games competitors for Jamaica
American people of Jamaican descent
People from Elmont, New York
Track and field athletes from New York (state)
Central American and Caribbean Games medalists in athletics
20th-century Jamaican women
21st-century Jamaican women